Electoral district VI (Croatian: VI. izborna jedinica) is one of twelve electoral districts of Croatian Parliament.

Boundaries  
Electoral district VI consist of:

 southeastern part of Zagreb County including cities and municipalities: Ivanić Grad, Kloštar Ivanić, Kravarsko, Križ, Orle, Pokupsko, Rugvica, Velika Gorica;
 whole Sisak-Moslavina County;
 southeastern part of City of Zagreb including city districts and streets: Volovčica, Folnegovićevo naselje, Donje Svetice, Bruno Bušić, Borongaj-Lugovi, Vukomerec, Ferenščica, Savica-Šanci, Žitnjak, Kozari Bok, Resnik, Kozari Putovi, Petruševac, Ivanja Reka, Trnava, Resnički Gaj, Kanal, Zapruđe, Utrine, Travno, Sopot, Siget, Sloboština, Dugave, Središće.

Election

2000 Elections 
 

SDP - HSLS
 Davorko Vidović
 Jozo Radoš
 Snježana Biga Friganović
 Tonino Picula
 Dorica Nikolić
 Slavko Kojić
 Katica Sedmak

HDZ
 Ivica Kostović
 Đuro Brodarac
 Ivan Milas
 Ivan Šuker

HSS - LS - HNS
 Stjepan Radić
 Zdenko Haramija

HSP - HKDU
 Vlado Jukić

2003 Elections 
 

HDZ
 Ivan Šuker
 Đuro Brodarac
 Stjepan Fiolić
 Mario Zubović
 Željko Nenadić
 Dražen Bošnjaković

SDP
 Davorko Vidović
 Ivo Banac
 Josip Leko
 Snježana Biga Friganović
 Ljubo Jurčić

HSP
 Velimir Kvesić

HNS
 Alenka Košiša Čičin-Šain

HSS
 Željko Ledinski

2007 Elections 
 

SDP
 Tonino Picula
 Davorko Vidović
 Marina Lovrić
 Šime Lučin
 Rajko Ostojić
 Mirando Mrsić

HDZ
 Ivan Šuker
 Stjepan Fiolić
 Ivan Šantek
 Boris Kunst
 Dražen Bošnjaković
 Marija Pejčinović Burić

HSS - HSLS
 Marijana Petir

HNS
 Goran Beus Richembergh

2011 Elections 
 

SDP - HNS - IDS - HSU
 Marina Lovrić Merzel
 Neven Mimica
 Boris Blažeković
 Rajko Ostojić
 Mirela Holy
 Daniel Mondekar
 Vesna Fabijančić-Križanić
 Goran Beus Richembergh
 Šime Lučin

HDZ - DC
 Ivan Šuker
 Jasen Mesić
 Ivan Šantek
 Vesna Škare-Ožbolt

HL SR
 Mladen Novak

2015 Elections 
 

SDP - HNS - HSU - HL SR - A-HSS - ZS
 Boris Lalovac
 Rajko Ostojić
 Goran Beus Richembergh
 Mirando Mrsić
 Ivo Jelušić
 Zoran Vasić

HDZ - HSS - HSP AS - BUZ - HSLS - HRAST - HDS - ZDS
 Goran Marić
 Ivo Žinić
 Gordan Jandroković
 Dražen Barišić
 Dražen Bošnjaković

Most
 Jasna Matulić
 Juro Martinović

BM365 - DPS - DSŽ - HES - HRS - HSZ - ID - MS - NSH - Novi val - SU - UDU - Zeleni - ZS
 Miodrag Demo

2016 Elections 
 

HDZ
 Goran Marić
 Ivo Žinić
 Dražen Barišić
 Drago Prgomet
 Dražen Bošnjaković
 Jasen Mesić

SDP - HNS - HSS - HSU
 Mirando Mrsić
 Bojan Glavašević
 Nenad Stazić
 Željko Lenart
 Goran Beus Richembergh

Most
 Nikola Grmoja

BM365 - NS R - Novi val - HSS SR - BUZ
 Darinko Dumbović

ŽZ - PH - AM - HDSS - Abeceda
 Ivan Pernar

2020 Elections 
 

HDZ
 Davor Božinović
 Marijana Petir
 Krunoslav Katičić
 Dražen Barišić
 Ivan Celjak
 Dražen Bošnjaković

SDP - HSS - HSU - SNAGA - GLAS - IDS - PGS - NS R
 Davorko Vidović
 Boris Lalovac
 Ivana Posavec Krivec
 Željko Lenart

DP - HS - BLOK - HKS - HRAST - SU - ZL
 Željko Sačić
 Stephen Nikola Bartulica

Možemo - ZJN - NL - RF - ORAH - ZG
 Bojan Glavašević

Most
 Nikola Grmoja

References 

Electoral districts in Croatia